Baghch-e-Simsim (باغچهٔ سم سم, "Sesame Garden") is a Dari- and Pashto-language co-production based on the American children's television series Sesame Street. The series  launched in Afghanistan in December 2011, and has aired on TOLO and Lemar.

Production history 
Sesame Street was first introduced to Afghanistan in 2004 as Koche Sesame, which was shown on state-owned television and as a teaching tool within some schools in the form of DVDs. One of the segments was "Grover Around the World", based directly on the "Global Grover" segments of the American original, as well as Sesame Street, and Play with Me Sesame.

Baghch-e-Simsim was partly filmed in Afghanistan, with other segments taken from other international productions and dubbed in Pashto and Dari.  

The project is funded by the U.S. embassy in Kabul and is produced in consultation with Afghanistan's Ministry of Education. Baghch-e-Simsim's initial 26 half-hour episodes were aired in Dari on locally owned Tolo TV. The Pashto version was later be aired on Lemar TV.

In July 2012 a radio version of the program was introduced, produced in partnership with Equal Access International.

Characters 
Non-original characters appearing in the show include Abby Cadabby, Bert (called Bart), Big Bird (called Shaw Parr), Cookie Monster (called Khajoor), Elmo,  Ernie (called Hadi), Grover (called Kajkoal), Oscar (called Gom Gom), Prairie (called Pari), Rosita (called Rukhsaar), Telly (called Shaarmac) and Zoe (called Zeba). 

The first local muppet, a six-year-old girl named Zari, was added to Baghch-e-Simsim on 7 April 2016 as part of the show's fifth season. Zari's brother Zeerak was introduced in 2017. Both characters are intentionally made to appear pan-Afghan, as their outfits combine elements from multiple ethnic groups; similarly, both Zari and Zeerak are common names in both Dari and Pashto. 

The program also features characters from other international productions, including Khokha (from Egypt's Alam Simsim, called Khushaal), Tuktuki (from Bangladesh's Sisimpur, called Gulguly),  Lola (from Mexico's Sésamo, called Laala), Businka (from Russia's Ulitsa Sezam, called Khwaaga), Raya (from Nigeria's Sesame Square), Chamki (from India's Galli Galli Sim Sim) and Shams (from the United Arab Emirates' Iftah Ya Simsim).

Content 
The show has girls' education as one of its primary focuses. The program also focus on building pan-Afghan unity and identity. In one segment characters visit the national museum and learn about Afghan music, instruments, and dances, while in other segments characters visit monuments or sites of national importance, such as the Gardens of Babur and the Kabul Zoo.

Unlike some other co-productions, Baghch-e-Simsim does include some references to religion, such as a segment where a mother blesses her daughter or where a father brings his daughter to a mosque. The show also includes clips of ethnic and religious minorities, including Sikh and Hazara children.

Reception and impact 
As of 2017, approximately 80% of Afghan families who have access to broadcast networks watch the program.

According to Sesame Workshop, children who watched the program tested 29% higher on gender equity attitudes, and fathers who watched the program were more likely to send their daughters to school. A 2012 study by the US Embassy Kabul similarly found that the show helped persuade men to send their girls to school, and that parents found they better understood how to support their children's mental and emotional development. The study also found that children who watched the show were more visibly enthusiastic about learning

TV channels and schedule
The show is broadcast:
 Every Thursday through Sunday at 4PM on Tolo TV.
 Every Thursday and Friday at 5PM and Saturdays and Sundays at 3:30PM on Lemar TV.

References

External links
Embassy of the United States, Kabul, Afghanistan - Sesame Street Launch 2011.11.30

2011 Afghan television series debuts
Sesame Street international co-productions